Shepardson is a surname. Notable people with the surname include:

John Shepardson (1729—1802), American settler
Ray Shepardson (1897–1975), American baseball player
Raymond K. Shepardson (1944–2014), American theatre restoration specialist and operator
Rob Shepardson, American political consultant and marketing strategist
Whitney Shepardson (1890–1966), American businessman and foreign policy expert